Nanodacna logistica is a moth of the family Agonoxenidae. It is found in Argentina.

References

Moths described in 1931
Agonoxeninae
Moths of South America